The 1947 Women's Western Open was a golf competition held at Capital City Club, the 18th edition of the event. Louise Suggs won the championship in match play competition by defeating Dorothy Kirby in the final match, 4 and 2.

Women's Western Open
Golf in Georgia (U.S. state)
Women's Western Open
Women's Western Open
Women's Western Open
Women in Atlanta
Women's sports in Georgia (U.S. state)